Martin J. Forde (born November 22, 1923) is an American retired labor union activist.

Life

Early life
Martin Forde was born in County Mayo, Ireland and emigrated to the United States in 1951. He quickly joined the Carpenter's Union in New York, becoming a member of United Brotherhood of Carpenters Local Union 608  on May 11, 1951.

Local 608 Tenure
After working as a carpenter for a number of years and working as a Shop Steward at the World Trade Center, he was appointed as an Assistant Business Agent by Local 608s President Paschal McGuinness. In 1987, Martin Forde was indicted for extortion and soliciting bribes, along with Johnny O'Connor of Local Union 608. Martin was eventually found guilty of these charges, and was given a suspended sentence on August 31, 1990 on condition of retiring from union office. Local Union 608 subsequently provided Martin with a Lincoln Towncar as a retirement present. Martin continued to exert influence over Local Union 608 policy and politics via his son Mike Forde.

Current
Martin Forde lives in Queens and East Durham, New York.

References

External links
 http://www.local608.org

1923 births
Living people
American trade unionists of Irish descent
People from Queens, New York
Trade unionists from New York (state)
United Brotherhood of Carpenters and Joiners of America people
Irish emigrants to the United States